A list of films produced in Hong Kong in 2007:.

2007

External links
 IMDB list of Hong Kong films
 Hong Kong films of 2007 at HKcinemamagic.com

2007
Films
Hong Kong